The Passion of Christ is a set of ten late 15th-century, Gothic religious paintings of the Passion of Jesus now displayed in the choir of the Catholic part of Old Saint Peter's Church in Strasbourg, France. The set is classified as a Monument historique by the French Ministry of Culture since 1978.

For other paintings of the Passion, see here.

History 
The oil paintings, depicting selected scenes from the Passion of Jesus, are dated approximately from 1485 or 1488 or around 1490. The artist is generally thought to be one Heinrich Lützelmann (or Henri Lutzelmann in French), active in Strasbourg during these times. According to some scholars, he may be identical with the Anonymous master "Master of the Drapery Studies", whose attributed work is recorded in the Alsatian capital during that period. The Musée de l’Œuvre Notre-Dame owns a few slightly earlier paintings by that artist, known in French as Maître des études de draperies.

The Strasbourg Passion of Christ was originally painted for the new Magdalene Church, which was completed in 1478. That church was almost entirely destroyed by a fire in 1904. The Passion paintings, however, had been sold by the Magdalene parish to the Saint Peter's parish at some point in the 19th century after the opening of the Neo-Gothic extension and were thus preserved. Most of the ten paintings feature donor portraits complete with coats of arms, on a much smaller scale than the main depicted event.

The paintings depict the episodes immediately preceding and following the Crucifixion of Jesus but not actually Jesus hanging from the Cross. In the church, this is represented by an 18th-century crucifix hung above the centre of the set.

Gallery

References

External links 

1480s paintings
Monuments historiques of Strasbourg
Paintings depicting the Passion of Jesus
German paintings
Gothic paintings
Christianity in Strasbourg
Paintings of the Descent from the Cross
Paintings of the Last Supper
Paintings depicting Christ Crowned with Thorns
Paintings in Strasbourg